Barnsley is the surname of:

Craig Barnsley (born 1983), South African born Welsh cricketer
Barnsley brothers, Ernest and Sidney, Arts and Crafts movement master builders, furniture designers and makers in the early 20th century
Edward Barnsley (1900–1987), designer and maker of furniture, teacher and an important figure in the British craft movement; son of Sidney Barnsley
Geoff Barnsley (born 1935), English former footballer
Godfrey Barnsley (1805–1873), British-American businessman and cotton broker
Grace Barnsley (1896–1975), English pottery decorator
Michael Barnsley, mathematician
Victoria Barnsley (born 1954), British businesswoman and entrepreneur

English toponymic surnames